Brigade General Salvador Pardo Cruz is a Cuban politician and the Cuban Minister of Heavy Industries (2009–present), replacing Fernando Acosta Santana after the 2009 shake-up by Raúl Castro.

Early life 
He is a radiotechnical engineer.  He had previously held the position of Director of the Military Industries Union. He is a member of the Communist Party of Cuba.

He was superior officer of the Revolutionary Armed Forces for more than 45 years, mainly in combat units of the Coheterile Antiaircraft Troops. He was General Coordinator and Director in 1998 of the companies belonging to the Union of Military Industry. He is in charge, since 2009, of the Ministry of the Sidero-Mechanical and Electronic Industry, replacing Fernando Acosta Santana and thus ending his position as General Director of the Union of Military Industry.

References
 The Miami Herald, Cuban Economy: Purge Aims to Halt Cuba's Economic Free Fall, Sunday March 8, 2009, Page 1A.
 Granma, Salvador Pardo Cruz, Tuesday, March 3, 2009, Nacionales Page 5

External links
https://web.archive.org/web/20090306080555/http://www.granma.cubaweb.cu/pdf/martes/pagina5.pdf
http://www.wtopnews.com/?nid=105&sid=1614566
https://abcnews.go.com/International/wireStory?id=6992631
https://www.reuters.com/article/worldNews/idUSTRE52868R20090309
https://web.archive.org/web/20090401152243/http://www.periodico26.cu/english/news_cuba/mar2009/official-note030209.html
http://www.embacubalebanon.com/cur_min1.html

Government ministers of Cuba
Living people
Communist Party of Cuba politicians
Year of birth missing (living people)